The Montenegrin Orthodox Church (Црногорска православна црква; abbr MOC, CPC or ЦПЦ) is a canonicaly unrecognized Eastern Orthodox Church. It was formed in 1993 and registered as a non-governmental organization. Antonije Abramović was appointed as its first metropolitan. It claims succession to an older and autocephalous Montenegrin Church, which operated until the unification of the Kingdom of Serbia and Kingdom of Montenegro, later to join the Kingdom of Serbs, Croats and Slovenes in 1918.

The Montenegrin Orthodox Church has been recognized as a religious organization by the Government of Montenegro since 2001. According to a 2020 poll conducted by CEDEM, approximately 10 percent of Montenegro's Eastern Orthodox Christians have opted for the Montenegrin Orthodox Church, while approximately 90 percent have opted for or stayed with the Serbian Orthodox Church in the canonical or widely-known Eastern Orthodox Church. Notably, the creation of the MOC has been opposed by the Ecumenical Patriarchate of Constantinople. Patriarch Bartholomew has stated that "we will never give autocephaly to the so-called 'Montenegrin Orthodox Church'" and that its leader Dedeić was suspended by Constantinople for adultery and embezzlement.

History 
The first ideas about creating a special Orthodox church of ethnic Montenegrins arose outside Montenegro, at a time when Montenegrin fascists and collaborators led by Sekula Drljević gathered under the auspices of the Ustaša regime in the Independent State of Croatia. During 1943 and 1944, under the influence of the clerical-fascist ideology of the Ustaša movement, Drljević formulated a thesis on the diversity of Montenegrin Orthodoxy not only in relation to Serbian Orthodoxy, but also in relation to Orthodoxy in general. On that occasion, he coined the notion of crnogorоslavlje, putting it in opposition to svetosavlje. Looking at the Ustaša project of the Croatian Orthodox Church, Drljevic claimed that "the Montenegrin Church has not been in any dependence of any Orthodox Church for all centuries".

The Montenegrin Orthodox Church was founded in Cetinje on October 31, 1993, led by Antonije Abramović who was appointed as patriarch, initially with the support of the Liberal Alliance of Montenegro (LSCG), a pro-Montenegrin independence political party that existed at the time. At the time, Montenegro was part of the federal state with Serbia called the Federal Republic of Yugoslavia, which was formed a year earlier following a 1992 referendum. LSCG, a party with a pro-independence agenda, is claimed to have used the MOC as a tool in their quest for Montenegrin sovereignty. At that time, the ruling Democratic Party of Socialists of Montenegro (DPS) maintained close ties to Slobodan Milošević's administration in Serbia, and therefore the initial activities of the MOC were very sporadic.

After the death of Metropolitan Antonije, he was replaced by Metropolitan Dedeić. Most liberals did not approve of this change, and their support for the church soon started to fade. By 1997, the DPS administration in Montenegro led by Milo Đukanović began to distance itself from Milošević, and started supporting and financing the church, which received support from both the Democratic Party of Socialists of Montenegro and the Social Democratic Party of Montenegro; however, after 2001 this support seemingly waned.

On January 17, 2001, the MOC was officially registered as a non-governmental organization at the local department of the Montenegrin Ministry of the Interior. In the absence of any other relevant and more current piece of legislation, this registration was done by calling on the Law on the Legal Position of Religious Communities from 1977 when Montenegro was a socialist republic within SFR Yugoslavia.

In 2007, the MOC attempted to expand its activities beyond the borders of Montenegro. Serbia originally refused to allow the MOC to be registered as an organization, as all canonical Eastern Orthodox churches have also refused to recognize the MOC. However, on appeal, the Serbian Supreme Court ruled this position unconstitutional, overturning the refusal and paving the way for a potential permission to register.

The Montenegrin Orthodox Church has offered to issue a baptismal certificate in which in the column "nationality", instead of an "Orthodox Serb" will be changed to "Orthodox Montenegrin". Following continued ethnic tension, in 2021, Montenegrins and Serbs clashed over leadership in the Serbian Orthodox Church within Montenegro.

Leadership and organization 
The Montenegrin Orthodox Church is currently led by the Archbishop of Cetinje and Montenegro Metropolitan Mihailo. At a General Montenegrin People's Assembly formed by the MOC in Cetinje on January 6, 1997, he was chosen by traditional public acclamation the Head of the Montenegrin Orthodox Church. In the Church of St. Paraskeva in Sofia, on March 15, 1998, he was ordained as bishop by Bulgarian Alternative Synod's head Patriarch Pimen and seven metropolitans and bishops of his synod. He was enthroned to Metropolitan of Montenegrin Orthodox Church in Cetinje on October 31, 1998, in the presence of several hundred believers and supporters of Montenegrin Orthodox Church.

Metropolitan Mihailo had worked as a professor for the Serbian Orthodox Church and then as a priest of the Greek Orthodox Church in Italy, where he created a Serbian Orthodox municipality out of the Greek Church, leading after a number of scandals, including adultery and accusations of embezzlement, to his permanent suspension from the church in 1995. After becoming Metropolitan of the MOC in 1997, he was fully excommunicated by the Holy Synod of the Ecumenical Patriarchate of Constantinople from the Eastern Orthodox Church.

On January 11, 2007, the MOC created its own holy synod and proclaimed its first decree. This holy synod is constituted by archpriests of the church, led by the Metropolitan Archbishop of the Montenegrin Orthodox Church. This synod divided Montenegro in five eparchies—Cetinjska, Dukljanska, Primorska, Ostroška and Beranska.

One of the prominent members of the Montenegrin Orthodox Church was Jelisej Lalatović, a former Serb monk from Nikšić, defrocked for stealing of church property and falsification of church seals. In early 2010 he joined with the Croatian Orthodox Union for the formation of the Croatian Orthodox Church and became its chief in Zadar. Lalatović was immediately expelled from the MOC on the grounds of spreading unrest and immorality in the church; the MOC officially dismissing its connections with the formation of the COC.

Within Montenegro 

The Montenegrin Orthodox Church currently holds its regular services in several chapels in the area of Montenegro's royal capital, Cetinje, as well as a church in Kotor. Open-air services are held across Montenegro for Christmas and Easter. The MOC officially opened a new shrine in the old town of Kotor in 2006, following the referendum on independence.

Outside Montenegro 
Construction of the first MOC churches abroad, the Holy Church of Righteous Ivan Crnojević, was planned to take place in Lovćenac, Vojvodina, Serbia, with the help of the Association of Ethnic Montenegrins in Serbia Krstaš. A contract for the land on which the new MOC shrine will be built was signed on 5 August 2005.

The Montenegrin Orthodox Church also has support from abroad, and it has managed to build several churches and missions in North America, South America, Australia, Western Europe all home to important Montenegrin émigré communities, most of whom also support the Montenegrin Orthodox Church. Services are held in the Australian state of New South Wales as well as in the Argentine province of Chaco, which is the base of Archimandrite Gorazd Glomazic and the Montenegrin Church of Saint Nikola in the colony of Machagay.

Claim to Serbian Orthodox churches 

In April 2007 the "President of the Council for the promotion" of the MOC, Stevo Vučinić, was quoted as saying the "we [the MOC] will retake of all the churches and chapels in the towns, and of course the village churches, and the monasteries...we expect resistance, but in no case will we give up".

On Wednesday, April 18, 2007, the representatives of the Montenegrin Orthodox Church – which has announced that it did not wish to cause an "excessive situation", but that it would enter the Serbian Orthodox Cetinje monastery without regard to the reaction of the Serbian Orthodox Church to their claims and requests – attempted to do so. Special police units prevented their forceful entry and that of several hundred supporters of the MOC. There was some pushing and shoving between the police, and the crowd which had intended to force its way into the monastery. Following this, members of the crowd shouted slogans such as "this isn't Serbia", "whose police are you?" and "Risto, Satan" (a reference to Metropolitan Amfilohije of the SOC).

In September 2008, Serbian Orthodox locals attempted to launch a blockade in the Nikšić area to prevent the MOC from building a church there. Sixty-five people were arrested for violating public order.

Recognition

Support from other churches 
The Montenegrin Orthodox Church has support from a number of likewise non-canonical or unrecognized Eastern Orthodox churches: the Ukrainian Orthodox Church – Kyiv Patriarchate, the Bulgarian Alternative Orthodox Church (founded by patriarch Pimen), and its Italian-based branch, the Orthodox Church in Italy.

The MOC also has support of the Croatian Orthodox Union, which aims at creating an autocephalous Croatian Orthodox Church for the Republic of Croatia, an act which the MOC came up to as the first supporter. The MOC had original support of the unrecognized Macedonian Orthodox Church, which was later withdrawn as the Macedonian Church entered negotiations for restoration into communion.

Following the granting of autocephaly to the Orthodox Church of Ukraine by Ecumenical Patriarch of Constantinople Bartholomew I, rumor spread that the Montenegrin Orthodox Church may soon receive a similar recognition; however, this was denied by Patriarch Bartholomew, who stated that ""we will never give autocephaly to the so-called 'Montenegrin Orthodox Church'" and that its leader Dedeić was suspended by Constantinople for adultery and embezzlement. In December 2022, Mihailo was granted an audience with Pope Francis I at the Holy See.

Support from political parties 
Political parties in Montenegro that so far officially stated support of the MOC have been: the Liberal Alliance of Montenegro and minority Croatian Civic Initiative, officially proposing it to be mentioned in Montenegro's new Constitution, which eventually did not mention it with its adoption in late 2007. The Initiative invited representatives of both the Montenegrin and Serbian churches to a special municipal meeting in Tivat, sparking a boycott among local Serbian politicians.

During the occasion of 2008 Serbian elections, the church had the support of the Alliance of Vojvodina Hungarians which stated it should be a recognized religion in the country. Afyer its 9th Congress, the Democratic Party of Socialists of Montenegro also endorsed the MOC as legitimate Church of Montenegro.

Public opinion 
According to data of Centre of Democracy in Montenegro from February 2007, the Serbian Orthodox Church was the most trusted institution in Montenegro by public opinion (coefficient 3.29), while the Montenegrin Orthodox Church was ranked sixth (coefficient 2.35). According to a 2020 poll conducted by CEDEM, approximately 10% percent of Montenegro's Eastern Orthodox Christians have opted for the Montenegrin Orthodox Church, while approximately 90% percent have opted for or stayed with the canonical Serbian Orthodox Church.

See also 
 Ukrainian Orthodox Church – Kyiv Patriarchate
 Abkhazian Orthodox Church
 Croatian Orthodox Church
 Macedonian Orthodox Church
 Orthodox Church in Italy

References

External links 

Montenegrin Orthodox church - official site, in Montenegrin
One faith, two churches: CNN.com article
MOC version, in Montenegrin
About MOC in English
Historical documents on religion in Montenegro, in Montenegrin
The Legal Foundations of the Montenegrin Orthodox Church (MOC)

 
m